Sphaeradenia brachiolata is a species of plant in the Cyclanthaceae family. It is endemic to Ecuador.  Its natural habitats are subtropical or tropical dry forests and subtropical or tropical moist montane forests.

References

brachiolata
Flora of Ecuador
Vulnerable plants
Taxonomy articles created by Polbot